Turnhouse Golf Club is a golf club situated in the West of Edinburgh on Lennie Hill at Turnhouse, Scotland.

History
The course dates back to 1897 when there were only 9-holes.  By 1900, the layout was expanded to 18 holes and James Braid made amendments to the original layout in 1924. This has been the home of Turnhouse Golf Club since the name changed from the Lothian Golf Club in 1909.

Contemporary times
The club host an annual 7-day tournament which is regarded as one of the best in the Lothians and usually attracts high calibre players from far and wide. The layout has changed in recent years to include a brand new 5th hole in addition to the reshaping of many of the original greens.

Junior golf
In 2005, Turnhouse became the first Edinburgh golf club to offer ClubGolf junior golf coaching. Their member, Iain Holt, has recently won a national award in recognition of his achievements. 

In 2013, the Turnhouse Junior team won a triple of the Edinburgh Summer League, the Edinburgh Inter Club and also the Scottish final of the Junior Team Golf Home Nations event.  The latter victory saw the team qualifying as Scottish Champions for the Home Nations Championship in Spain.

References

Further reading
 (8 January 2005.) "Golfers' range plans face being bunkered." The Scotsman. Accessed November 2011.
 (10 June 2005.) "Turnhouse helping children to get in the swing of golf." The Scotsman. Accessed November 2011.
 (28 August 2006.) "Golf club idea swings it with planners." The Scotsman. Accessed November 2011.
 (11 June 2007.) "Golf's no longer a good walk spoiled - you can now stand still." The Scotsman. Accessed November 2011.
 (21 May 2008.) "Girls are given their Turn in bid to find golfing stars of the future." The Scotsman. Accessed November 2011.

External links
Official website

Golf clubs and courses in Edinburgh
Sports venues in Edinburgh
Sports venues completed in 1897